was one of the World War II Hi convoys of fast tankers and troop transports from Japan to Singapore. The heavily defended convoy was specially loaded with reinforcements for defense of the Philippines, and encountered a wolfpack of United States Navy submarines in the South China Sea after being scattered by an August 1944 typhoon. Personnel losses were high because heavy seas prevented rescue of crewmen from sunken ships.

Background
Japanese shipping through the South China Sea carried much of the food sustaining the Japanese population, the petroleum fueling Japan's aircraft and warships, and the raw materials for World War II. Japanese aircraft and warships patrolled South China Sea shipping lanes from bases in the Philippines; and loss of those bases would threaten the flow of resources needed to defend the Empire of Japan.

As Allied forces converged to fulfill Douglas MacArthur's promised return, Japan implemented Operation Shō to defend the Philippines. Convoy Hi-71 carried Imperial Japanese Army troops, weaponry and supplies from the home islands of Japan to reinforce the Philippines. The convoy left Moji on 8 August 1944 accompanied by the 6th Escort Group of two destroyers and five kaibōkan with an escort carrier embarking the 931st Air Group detachment of a dozen Nakajima B5N "Kate" attack planes. As the convoy departed the Mako naval base in the Pescadores on 17 August, it was reinforced by another destroyer and four kaibōkan to counter United States submarines operating in the Luzon Strait.

Battle of 18 and 19 August
Redfish found the convoy on the evening of 17 August, and maneuvered into position to launch four torpedoes at a large ship and a fifth torpedo at the escort carrier. Eiyo Maru was hit by a torpedo at 0524 on 18 August. Asakaze and Yūnagi were detached to escort the damaged ship back to Takao as a typhoon developed with force 12 winds from the southeast. Picuda and Spadefish were unable to locate the convoy in the deteriorating visibility, and heavy seas loosened plates on the superstructure of Redfish. The convoy became scattered and disorganized in heavy weather and darkness.

Rasher observed nine successive aircraft contacts to the north on the afternoon of 18 August and deduced these were air patrols for an important convoy. The escorts fired wildly and laid depth charge patterns astern of Rasher. In a second surfaced approach to  Rasher launched a spread of six bow torpedoes at 2310. Three torpedoes hit and sank the transport Teia Maru, killing 2,665 Japanese soldiers, and a fourth torpedo was heard exploding at a timed range of 3900 yards. Rasher swung hard left to launch four stern torpedoes at 2214. Three torpedoes hit and sank the escort carrier Taiyō, and the fourth torpedo was heard exploding on a more distant ship.Rasher pulled away to reload torpedo tubes and the convoy split into two groups. Rasher followed three large ships with one kaibōkan moving northwest while Bluefish intercepted the remaining ships continuing southwesterly and fired torpedoes at two tankers. The fourth torpedo was heard exploding on a more distant ship. Rasher then swung hard right to launch two stern torpedoes. Both torpedoes hit at 0033 and Noshiro Maru slowed to  reversing course and firing briefly at Etorofu believing it to be the attacking submarine.

Other portions of the scattered convoy were attacked by Redfish and Spadefish. Japanese sources indicate Tamatsu Maru simply disappeared. Uncertainty remains about which submarines launched torpedoes striking the ships of convoy Hi-71; but JANAC credited Spadefish with sinking Tamatsu Maru fleeing northward at 0333. Sado, Matsuwa and Hiburi attempted to hold the American submarines down while Noshiro Maru and Awa Maru beached themselves at Port Currimao to avoid sinking, and undamaged ships took refuge in San Fernando, La Union.

Manila
After convoy Hi-71 reformed in San Fernando, it arrived in Manila on 21 August. Awa Maru was towed into Manila the same day, and Noshiro Maru reached Manila on 24 August. Matsuwa and Hiburi were torpedoed by Harder at 0456, and Sado was torpedoed by Haddo at 0524 while attempting to aid the stricken sister kaibōkan. Additional torpedoes were required to sink the three kaibōkan. Haddo sank Sado with a three torpedo salvo at 0720, while Harder sank Matsuwa at 0649 and Hiburi at 0755.Asakaze and Yūnagi departed Takao on 21 August to rejoin the convoy at Manila with the new tankers Hakko Maru No. 2 and Niyo Maru bound for Singapore. Spadefish hit Hakko Maru No. 2 with two torpedoes off Cape Bojeador Lighthouse at 1455 on 22 August. The damaged tanker was beached in Pasaleng Bay while Yūnagi stood by. Spadefish fired four more torpedoes at the beached tanker until a depth charge attack by Yūnagi chased away the submarine. Yūnagi was relieved of responsibility for Hakko Maru No. 2 on 25 August and was sunk an hour later by Picuda. Hakko Maru No. 2 remained beached until destroyed by heavy surf on 18 September.Asakaze escorted Niyo Maru toward Manila. Haddo hit Asakaze with its last torpedo at 0800 23 August. As  and Harder approached to finish off the damaged destroyer (which had already sunk), they were intercepted at 0630 on 24 August by CD No. 22 and the captured United States destroyer Patrol Boat No. 102. Harder fired a salvo of torpedoes at CD No. 22, and was spotted by a Japanese aircraft which marked the location.

The reformed convoy Hi-71, less the surviving Philippine reinforcements, left Manila on 26 August escorted by Fujinami, Hirato, Kurahishi and Mikura, and reached Singapore on 1 September. The unrepaired Noshiro Maru'' remained in Manila Bay until destroyed on 21 September by aircraft of Task Force 38.

Japanese ships in convoy Hi-71

See also
 Convoy Battles of World War II

Sources

Notes

Naval battles of World War II involving the United States
Naval battles of World War II involving Japan
1944 in Asia
Pacific convoys of World War II
August 1944 events